Star Wars: Young Jedi Adventures is an upcoming American animated series created for the streaming service Disney+ and the television network Disney Junior. It is part of the Star Wars franchise and follows a group of younglings as they learn to become Jedi Knights during the High Republic era, centuries before the main Star Wars films. The series is produced by Lucasfilm Animation, with Michael Olson as showrunner and Elliot Bour as supervising director. It is the first full-length animated Star Wars series targeted at young audiences.

The series stars Jamaal Avery Jr., Emma Berman, Juliet Donenfeld, Dee Bradley Baker, Jonathan Lipow, and Piotr Michael. It was announced in May 2022, with Olson and Bour already attached to the project.

Star Wars: Young Jedi Adventures is set to premiere on April 26, 2023.

Premise 
Set during the High Republic era, centuries before the events of the main Star Wars films, Star Wars: Young Jedi Adventures follows a group of younglings as they learn the ways of the Force, including compassion, self-discipline, team work and patience, to become Jedi Knights.

Cast and characters 
 Jamaal Avery Jr. as Kai Brightstar: a Jedi youngling who hopes to follow in the footsteps of Jedi Master Yoda and become a Jedi Knight
 Emma Berman as Nash Durango: a pilot who is friends with Kai and the other younglings, and teams-up with them to go on adventures
 Juliet Donenfeld as Lys Solay, a Jedi youngling
 Dee Bradley Baker as Nubs, a Jedi youngling
 Jonathan Lipow as RJ-83, a droid friend of the younglings
 Piotr Michael as Yoda, a Jedi master

Production

Development 
Star Wars: Young Jedi Adventures, the first full-length animated Star Wars series targeted at young audiences and their families, was announced at Star Wars Celebration in May 2022. It is set during the High Republic era, centuries before the events of the main Star Wars films, which was already being explored through a series of books and comics at the time. The series was announced by executive producer James Waugh, executive producer and showrunner Michael Olson, supervising director Elliot Bour, and consulting producer Lamont Magee. Lucasfilm's Jacqui Lopez and Josh Rimes are also executive producers. Waugh said the creative team were aware that the series could be the first introduction to Star Wars for some children. Though they wanted the "characters, tone, and the life lessons" in each episode to be aimed at the younger audience, they also wanted to stay true to the expectations of people familiar with Star Wars.

Casting 
At the D23 Expo in September 2022, Jamaal Avery Jr. and Emma Berman were announced as cast in the series' lead roles of Kai Brightstar and Nash Durango, respectively. In February 2023, it was announced that Juliet Donenfeld was cast as Lys Solay, Dee Bradley Baker as Nubs, Jonathan Lipow as RJ-83, and Piotr Michael as Yoda.

Music 
Matthew Margeson was hired to compose the score for the series by late July 2022.

Release 
Star Wars: Young Jedi Adventures is set to premiere on the streaming service Disney+ and the television network Disney Junior April 26, 2023.

References

External links 
 

 

2020s American animated television series
2020s American children's television series
2020s American science fiction television series
2020s preschool education television series

American animated television spin-offs
American children's animated adventure television series
American children's animated science fiction television series
American computer-animated television series
American preschool education television series
Animated television shows based on films
Animated preschool education television series
Animated television series about children
Animated television series about extraterrestrial life
Disney+ original programming
Disney Junior original programming
Prequel television series
Young Jedi Adventures
Television series by Lucasfilm
Upcoming animated television series